Matt Cook (born July 12, 1984) is an American actor, known mostly for his roles as Mo McCracken on the TBS sitcom Clipped and Lowell in the CBS sitcom Man with a Plan.

Personal life
Matt Cook was born in Harrisburg, Pennsylvania, and grew up in Barnegat Light and Ship Bottom on Long Beach Island in New Jersey, where he attended Southern Regional High School. He attended Rider University in Lawrenceville, New Jersey, where he earned a Bachelor of Arts degree. He then moved to Los Angeles and trained in improv and sketch comedy at The Groundlings.

Career
Cook first appeared on television as a waiter in the HBO series Curb Your Enthusiasm. He went on to have recurring roles in Unleashed, Harry's Law and True Blood before landing a starring role on the short-lived TBS sitcom Clipped in 2015. In 2016, Cook was cast as Lowell in the new CBS sitcom Man with a Plan, starring Matt LeBlanc up until the show's cancellation in 2020. Cook also appeared in episode 4 of the first season of Mom.

Select filmography

References

External links

1984 births
Living people
American male television actors
Male  actors from New Jersey
People from Barnegat Light, New Jersey
People from Harrisburg, Pennsylvania
People from Ship Bottom, New Jersey
Rider University alumni
Southern Regional High School alumni